Delta G Scientific Company was originally a front company established April 1982 in Weldegraan, Pretoria by the South African Defence Force to research and produce chemical weapons within a covert operation known as Project Coast.

Medchem Consolidated Investments was registered in the Cayman Islands by a David Webster on behalf of Wouter Basson, who held 75% of Delta G shares.

Delta G was acquired in 1993 by Sentrachem, which is since 1997 a subsidiary of the Dow Chemical Company.

Other SADF front organisations
 Badger Arms
 Biocon (South Africa)
 Civil Cooperation Bureau
 Electronic Magnetic Logistical Component
 Geo International Trading
 Infladel
 Jeugkrag
 Jeugweerbaarheid - Free translation from Afrikaans = (White Afrikaner Male) Youth (Military) Resistance 
 Lema (company)
 Military Technical Services
 Protechnik
 Roodeplaat Research Laboratories
 Staats Veiligheids Raad - Free translation from Afrikaans - (Apartheid) State Security (Eternal Upholdment) Council
 Veterans for Victory

References

Defence companies of South Africa
Chemical warfare facilities
South African companies established in 1982
Research institutes in South Africa